These are the official results of the Women's 100 metres hurdles event at the 2001 IAAF World Championships in Edmonton, Canada.

Medalists

Results

Heats
Qualification: First 3 in each heat (Q) and the next 4 fastest (q) advanced to the semifinals.

Semifinals
Qualification: First 4 in each semifinal qualified directly (Q) for the final.

Final
Wind: 2 m/s

References

 Results
 IAAF

H
Sprint hurdles at the World Athletics Championships
2001 in women's athletics